The poll is a name of the part of an animal's head, alternatively referencing a point immediately behind or right between the ears. This area of the anatomy is of particular significance for the horse. 

Specifically, the "poll" refers to the occipital protrusion at the back of the skull.  However, in common usage, many horsemen refer to the poll joint, between the atlas (C1) and skull as the poll. The area at the joint has a slight depression, and is a sensitive location.  Thus, because the crownpiece of a bridle passes over the poll joint, a rider can indirectly exert pressure on the horse's poll by means of the reins, bit, and bridle.

Importance of the poll in riding
The poll is especially important in riding, as correct flexion at the poll joint is a sign that the horse is properly on the bit. Over-flexion, with the poll lowered and the neck bent at a cervical vertebra farther down the neck, is usually a sign that the horse is either evading contact or that the rider is trying to pull the horse onto the bit, rather than correctly ride from behind. In classical dressage, the poll should always be the highest point on the horse when the horse is on the bit. The horse is always relaxed over the poll, giving it a relaxed look when going about its job. When, for example, the third vertebra (C3) is the highest point on the neck, rather than the poll, it is a clear sign of incorrect work.

See also
 Polled livestock, for information on naturally or mechanically dehorned animals

References
 Bennett, Deb.  Principles of Conformation Analysis, volume I.  Fleet Street Publishing, 1988. .

Horse anatomy